Manjula Swarup (née Ghattamaneni; born 8 November 1970) is an Indian film producer and actress known for her work in Telugu Cinema. Born to prominent Telugu actor Krishna, she began her acting career by doing a cameo role in the 1999 film Rajasthan and went on to act as a supporting actor in the Malayalam film Summer in Bethlehem. She found fame by starring and producing in the 2002 film Show. The film won the National Film Award for Best Feature Film in Telugu and National Film Award for Best Screenplay for that year. She owns a film production company called Indira Productions, named after her mother.

Personal life
She is the second daughter and third child of veteran actor Krishna and his first wife Indira Devi. She has two brothers and two sisters. Her elder brother Ramesh Babu was also a film producer and her younger brother Mahesh Babu is a popular Telugu actor.

Manjula is married to producer and actor Sanjay Swarup. They have a daughter named Jaanvi. She is known to be good friends with her sister-in-law Namrata Shirodkar.

Manjula is a meditator and has been pursuing meditation for 20 years.

Career
Manjula was initially set to make her acting debut in a film co-starring actor M. N. Nambiar's grandson Deepak, but the film did not progress. She began her career by doing a cameo as a terrorist in R. K. Selvamani's Rajasthan. She also acted as one of the female leads in the 1998 Malayalam film Summer in Bethlehem, starring Suresh Gopi and Jayaram. When Manjula began her career, she faced an unfavorable response from her father's fans as they did not want her to act.

In 2002, she produced and starred in the film Show. Directed by Neelakanta, the film won the National Film Award for Best Feature Film in Telugu.

Her second production venture was Naani (2004), directed by S. J. Suryah. The movie starred her brother, actor Mahesh Babu. The movie failed to do well at the box office. In 2006, she co-produced her third movie Pokiri, an action blockbuster with Puri Jagannadh. The movie was a blockbuster hit and was the highest-grossing movie in the Telugu film industry of the time.

In 2009, she returned to acting with her next production venture Kavya's Diary. In 2010, she along with her husband produced Ye Maaya Chesave, a romantic love story with Naga Chaitanya under Gautham Vasudev Menon's direction. The movie got critical acclaim and was declared a hit at the box office. The same year, she also appeared in the movie Orange, alongside her husband Sanjay Swaroop. 

In 2018, she directed her first film Manasuku Nachindi. In 2020, she launched her personal website and YouTube channel.

Awards
National Film Awards
2003 - National Film Award for Best Feature Film in Telugu (Producer) - Show

Nandi Awards
2006 - Nandi Award for Best Popular Feature Film  - (Co-producer) - Pokiri
2001 - Nandi Special Jury Award - (Producer) - Show

Filmography

As director

As producer

As actor

Television

References

External links
 

Living people
Actresses in Telugu cinema
Indian film actresses
1970 births
Actresses from Chennai
20th-century Indian actresses
21st-century Indian actresses
Indian women film producers
Telugu film producers
Film producers from Chennai
Businesswomen from Tamil Nadu
21st-century Indian businesspeople
21st-century Indian businesswomen
Actresses in Malayalam cinema
Actresses in Tamil cinema